Andrea Hlaváčková and Lucie Hradecká were the defending champions, and won in the final, 6–2, 6–4, against Tatjana Malek and Andrea Petkovic.

Seeds

  Iveta Benešová /  Barbora Záhlavová-Strýcová (quarterfinals, withdrew)
  İpek Şenoğlu /  Yaroslava Shvedova (first round)
  Andrea Hlaváčková /  Lucie Hradecká (champions)
  Mariya Koryttseva /  Ioana Raluca Olaru (semifinals)

Draw

Draw

External links
 Draw

Gastein Ladies - Doubles
Gastein Ladies
Gast
Gast